Auzeil is a surname. Notable people with the surname include:

Bastien Auzeil (born 1989), French decathlete
Nadine Auzeil (born 1964), French javelin thrower, mother of Bastien